ŽRK Zamet (Ženski rukometni Klub Zamet) is a women's handball club from Rijeka, Croatia, formed in 1957. The club currently competes in the Croatian First League and the Croatian Handball Cup.

History
The club was founded in September 1957 as RK Partizan Zamet by Prof. Stanko Jerger, Josip Šarić and Vittorio Drog. On the initiative of Stanko Jerger, the women's team was made later. Until January 1985, the club was combined with RK Zamet.

In 1962, the players of Partizan Zamet went to the quarter finals of the Yugoslav Cup where they lost 6:5 to Zagreb. The next year, they finished second in the Croatian championship and failed to qualify for the First League, being one point behind Partizan Bjelovar. They failed to qualify for the next three seasons. In 1966, Zamet eliminated ŽRK Rudar Labin in the qualifications for entering the first league.
From 1971 to 1974, the club played in the Yugoslav First League. After 1974, the club played in the second tier of the Yugoslav Women's Handball Championship until the collapse of the Yugoslav league.

In the first season of the Croatian league, Zamet played in the 1.B HRL, won the league, and got promoted to the 1.A HRL the same season. In their first season in the 1.A HRL, the club finished in third place and qualified for the EHF City Cup, which was their first appearance in a European competition. The club was then led by Slavko Bralić.

From 2002 to 2004, the club was called Croatia Osiguranje Zamet due to sponsorship.

The club's best successes were the two cup finals (in 2014 and 2016) and the second place in the league in 2015, in the season in which they fought for the title with Podravka, with a generation which they led by Ćamila Mičijević and Dejana Milosavljević, which they later made the respectable career and won the bronze medal at the 2020 European Women's Handball Championship with national team.

Venue

Since the foundation of the club, matches were played on the playground Zamet when field handball was played.

As of 2009, the club has been playing in Centar Zamet. The capacity of the venue is 2,350 spectators.

Seasons

Since the beginning of Croatian handball in 1992, Zamet has competed at the highest level except for four seasons when they were in the second tier.

1 The season was voided due to COVID-19 pandemic.

Team

Current squad
Squad for the 2020-21 season

 * Blažić Irina
 * Đuzel Allsu
 * Hodžić Adela
 * Hren Patricia
 * Krivičić Tea
 * Mikolić Katja
 * Milošević Laura
 * Mršić Elena
 * Nikolić Noel
 * Perčić Bahtiri Nayana
 * Pleša Nikolina
 * Pleše Nika

 * Polić Lea
 * Ramić Mihaela
 * Rončević Iva
 * Sabalić Veronika
 * Skokandić Katia
 * Stanić Iva
 * Tabar Iva
 * Toskić Ella
 * Troskot Stefanie
 * Visković Maja

Technical staff
  President:  Iva Lesjak
  Head coach:  Drago Žiljak 
  Assistant, GK Coach:  Željko Vujmilović
  Fitness Coach:  Nikola Babić
  Physiotherapist: Iva Mikolić
  Second Team Coach:  Edo Šmit 
  Second Team GK Coach:  Robert Lukić
  Youth Academy Coaches:  Tamara Košpić,  Maja Višković,  Katja Mikolić,  Patricia Hren, 

Source: zrk-zamet.hrSource: rukometstat.hr

Notable former players

  Marija Malik
  Ida Crljenica
  Zlata Fazlić
  Željka Maras
  Tea Morsi
  Nada Rukavina
  Gordana Čorak
  Branka Zuber
  Jadranka Mijolović
  Branka Strišković
  Suzana Gustin
 Ljerka Krajnović
 Rada Ciganović
 Gordana Možnik
 Jasenka Pilepić
 Višnja Hrmić
 Sanja Bobanović
 Irena Pahor
 Sandra Stojković
 Ella Bukvić
 Anamarija Gugić
 Tea Bunić
 Dina Havić
 Katarina Ježić
 Ćamila Mičijević
 Ana Debelić
 Kristina Plahinek
 Selena Milošević
 Dejana Milosavljević

Coaches

  Stanko Jerger (1957-1968)
  Stanko Jerger & Simeon Kosanović (1968-1969)
  Simeon Kosanović (1969-1975)
  Branimir Čutić (1975-1981)
  Andrija Barin (1981)
  Josip Božić (1982)
  Marijan Seđak (1982-1985)
  Sandro Bogojević (1985-1986)
  Edo Šmit (1986-1988)
  Vjekoslav Sardelić (1988-1990)
  Damir Čavlović (1991)
  Zdravko Štingl (1991-1992)
  Slavko Bralić (1992-1994)
  Edo Šmit (1994)
  Mladenko Mišković (1995)
  Edo Šmit (1995-1999)
  Branimir Čutić (1999-2001)
  Darko Dunato (2001-2002)
  Boris Dragičević (2002-2005)
  Damir Čavlović (2005-2007)
  Rada Ciganović (2007-2008)
  Edo Šmit (2008-2011)
  Drago Žiljak (17 July 2011- 28 August 2012)
  Željko Čagalj (28 August 2012 - 28 April 2013)
  Adriana Prosenjak (13 May 2013 – 13 March 2019)
  Igor Marijanović (15 April 2019 - 28 August 2020 )
  Drago Žiljak (1 September 2020 - present )

Presidents

 1957–1968 - Vittorio Drog☨ 
 1968–1977 - Stanko Jerger 
 1977–1979 - Ivan Brnabić 
 1979–1980 - Fedor Pirović 
 1980–1983 - Drago Crnčević 
 1983–1985 - Petar Čarić 
 1985–1991 - Ranko Dujmović  
 1991-1994 - Srđan Čevizović 
 1994-1999 - Ranko Dujmović 
 1999–2019 - Luka Denona 
 2019 - present - Iva Lesjak

Honours

Croatia
1.HRL
Runner-up (1): 2014–15
1.B HRL
Winners (2): 1991–92, 1996–97
Croatian Cup
Finalist (2): 2014, 2016

Yugoslavia
Yugoslav Second League (North)
Winners (1): 1977–78
Regional league of Primorje and Istra
Winners (3): 1967–68, 1968–69, 1969–70
Rijeka League
Winners (4): 1957–58, 1958–59, 1961–62, 1963–64

European record

Rankings

EHF club coefficient ranking
(As of 24 September 2020), source: Eurotopteam website

Related clubs
RK Zamet

Sources
Petar Orgulić - 50 godina rukometa u Rijeci (2005), Adria public

References

External links
WHC Zamet europe
ŽRK Zamet europe
First league and cup stats 2009-present
News from 2011-present
Competition

Croatian handball clubs
Handball clubs established in 1957
1957 establishments in Croatia
Sport in Rijeka
Women's sports teams in Croatia
Women's handball clubs
Women's handball in Croatia